The year 1606 in music involved some significant events.

Events 
January 5 – The nuptial masque Hymenaei, with music by Alfonso Ferrabosco the younger, is performed in London.

Publications 
Agostino Agazzari
 (Rome: Aloysio Zannetti)
Second book of madrigals for five voices (Venice: Ricciardo Amadino)
Gregor Aichinger
Mass for the solemnity of Corpus Christi (Augsburg: Johannes Praetorius)
 for three and four voices (Dillingen: Adam Metzler)
 (Dillingen: Adam Metzler)
Richard Allison – An howres recreation in Musicke, apt for instruments and voyces (London: John Windet)
Felice Anerio –  (Rome: Aloysio Zannetti)
Bartolomeo Barbarino –  for solo voice with theorbo, harpsichord, or other instruments (Venice: Ricciardo Amadino), also includes a song for two tenors
John Bartlet – A Booke of Ayres with a Triplicitie of Musicke (London: John Windet), a collection of lute songs for 1, 2, & 4 voices
Sethus Calvisius –  for four voices (Leipzig: Abraham Lamberg), a motet
Giovanni Paolo Cima –  (Milan: Simon Tini & Filippo Lomazzo)
Camillo Cortellini – Psalms for eight voices (Venice: Giacomo Vincenti)
Christian Erbach –  for five voices, parts 2 & 3 (Dillingen: Adam Meltzer), a collection of introits, alleluias, and post-communion songs
Giacomo Finetti –  for four voices (Venice: Ricciardo Amadino), music for Vespers
Marco da Gagliano – Fourth book of madrigals for five voices (Venice: Angelo Gardano)
Konrad Hagius –  (ie. Magnificat) for four, five, and six voices (Dillingen: Adam Meltzer)
Sigismondo d'India – First book of madrigals for five voices (Milan: Agostino Tradate)
Marc'Antonio Ingegneri
Second book of hymns for four voices (Venice: Ricciardo Amadino), published posthumously
Sixth book of madrigals for five voices (Venice: Ricciardo Amadino), published posthumously
Claude Le Jeune
 for two, three, four, five, six, seven, and eight voices (Paris: Pierre Ballard), published posthumously
 (Eight-line poems on the vanity and inconstancy of the world) for three and four voices (Paris: Pierre Ballard), published posthumously
Tiburtio Massaino –  for eight, nine, ten, twelve, fifteen, and sixteen voices, Op. 31 (Venice: Angelo Gardano)
Ascanio Mayone – First book of ricercars for three voices (Naples: Giovanni Battista Sottile)
Girolamo Montesardo – , published in Florence, the first printed source of alfabeto notation for the guitar
Nicola Parma – Motets for eight and twelve voices (Venice: Ricciardo Amadino)
Serafino Patta -  (Venice: Giacomo Vincenti)
Enrico Antonio Radesca (Radesca di Foggia) – Second book of canzonettas, madrigals and arie della romana for two voices (Milan: Simon Tini & Filippo Lomazzo)

Classical music 
Agostino Agazzari – Eumelio (oratorio), premiered in Rome at the Roman Seminary during Carnival, published in Venice by Ricciardo Amadino
John Coprario – Funeral Teares for one and two voices (London: John Windet for William Barley for John Browne), written on the death of the Earl of Devonshire (April 3, 1606).

Opera 
Andrea Cima – La Gentile

Births 
date unknown
William Child, organist and composer (d. 1697)
Johannes Khuen, poet and composer (d. 1675)
Urbán de Vargas, composer (d. 1656)

Deaths 
January 28 – Guillaume Costeley, composer (b. c.1530)
September 9 – Leonhard Lechner, composer and music editor (born c. 1553)
date unknown
Jan Trojan Turnovský, composer (born c.1550)
Jiří Nigrin, music publisher
probable – Pellegrino Micheli, violin maker (born c.1530)

References 

 
Music
17th century in music
Music by year